Richard Sandler (born 1946) is an American street photographer and documentary filmmaker who has made work in New York City. His photographs have been published in The Eyes of the City (2016) and are held in the collections of Brooklyn Museum and the Museum of Fine Arts, Houston. His films include The Gods of Times Square (1999), Brave New York (2004), and Radioactive City (2011). He has received a Guggenheim Fellowship for filmmaking.

Sandler has a restrospective exhibition on at the Bronx Documentary Center in New York City from February 11 to March 26, 2023.

Life and work
Sandler grew up in Forest Hills, Queens, New York City. In 1968, he moved to Boston to work as a macrobiotic chef, and later as an acupuncturist. At some point he boarded with motivational psychologist David McClelland and his wife Mary. "Mary gave Sandler her Leica 3F in 1977 and taught him how to develop film in their basement darkroom." That year he began making photographs on the streets of Boston, which led to him working as a photojournalist. Three years later he moved back to New York City where he continued to make street photographs until September 11, 2001. Sandler had begun making films in New York in the early 1990s and after 9/11 he switched from photography to filmmaking, producing a series of free-form documentaries.

His book, The Eyes of the City (2016), contains photographs made between 1977 and the weeks before 9/11 in New York and Boston, with most from between 1977 and 1992 in New York, and several from Boston.

Publications
The Eyes of the City. Brooklyn, NY: powerHouse, 2016. With a foreword by David Isay and an afterword by Jonathan Ames. .

Films
Sandler directed and produced the following documentaries:
The Gods of Times Square (1999)
Brave New York (2004)
Sway (2006)
Everybody Is Hurting (2006)
The Rocks of Eternity: Conversations with Satish Kumar (2007)
Forever and Sunsmell (2010)
Radioactive City (2011)

Exhibitions
The Eyes of the City, a retrospective, the Bronx Documentary Center, New York City, February 11 – March 26, 2023

Awards
2006: Guggenheim Fellowship from the John Simon Guggenheim Memorial Foundation for filmmaking

Collections
Sandler's work is held in the following permanent collections:
Brooklyn Museum, Brooklyn, NY: 2 prints (as of 3 October 2022)
Museum of Fine Arts, Houston, TX: 1 print1 (as of 3 October 2022)

References

External links

20th-century American photographers
Street photographers
Photographers from New York City
American documentary film directors
Film directors from New York City
Film producers from New York (state)
American documentary film producers
People from Forest Hills, Queens
Living people
1946 births